Hovnatanian is a crater on Mercury. Its “butterfly” pattern of ejecta rays were created by an impact at an even lower angle than that which formed neighboring Qi Baishi crater. From the "butterfly" pattern of rays (similar to Messier crater on the moon), the Hovnatanian impactor was travelling either north-to-south or south-to-north prior to hitting Mercury's surface.

The crater was named for Hakob Hovnatanyan, a 19th-century Armenian artist.

Views

References

Impact craters on Mercury